John Lucas "Jack" McBean (born December 15, 1994) is an American former professional soccer player who played as a forward.

Club career 
McBean, a California native, formally signed for LA Galaxy at the age of 16 in April 2011. As of July 2011, he was the youngest player to have signed for the club in its history. He had previously played for the LA Galaxy under-16s and, prior to that, Slammers FC and Corona del Mar High School.

He was assigned the number 32 shirt for the 2011 Major League Soccer season.

He made his first appearance for the club in a friendly match against Manchester City on July 24, 2011, coming on as a 66th-minute substitute for teammate Miguel Pedro López. The Los Angeles Times noted that he "quickly provided a threat" after appearing, while Fox Sports West stated that he "immediately made an impact" in the game. The match finished 1-1, but included a penalty shootout. Manchester City won the shootout 7-6, with McBean having his penalty saved by goalkeeper Joe Hart. On October 23, 2011 McBean played his first league game against Houston Dynamo getting the start, and subsequently scored.

He moved down to the LA Galaxy's reserve club, LA Galaxy II, following the 2014 season. On June 22, 2016 he was once again signed by LA Galaxy.

McBean signed for English League One side Coventry City on a five-month loan deal on August 19, 2016. The striker made his first-team debut as a substitute in the 1-1 draw with Morecambe in the FA Cup.

McBean was released by LA Galaxy on November 7, 2017. He was traded to Colorado Rapids on December 14, 2017 in exchange for a conditional fourth-round pick in the 2019 MLS SuperDraft. McBean was released by Colorado at the end of their 2018 season.

McBean retired from professional soccer following the 2018 season due to a foot injury that was suffered near the conclusion of the season.

International career 
McBean represented his country of birth at youth levels. He played for the United States under-17s in the 2011 FIFA U-17 World Cup, in which the US reached the round of 16, and in the 2011 CONCACAF U-17 Championship, in which the US were champions.

McBean has a Scottish father and was eligible to play for the senior national teams of the United States and Scotland. In June 2011, Scotland manager Craig Levein confirmed that he had instructed his chief scout Michael Oliver to continue a dialogue with the player and his parents to determine his interest in representing Scotland in future. He did not confirm a long-term allegiance to either country.

Career statistics

Club

Honors
LA Galaxy
MLS Cup: 2011, 2012, 2014
Supporters' Shield: 2011

LA Galaxy II
Western Conference (Playoffs): 2015

United States under-17s
CONCACAF U-17 Championship: 2011

References

External links
 

1994 births
Living people
American soccer players
American expatriate soccer players
LA Galaxy players
LA Galaxy II players
Coventry City F.C. players
Colorado Rapids players
Sportspeople from Newport Beach, California
Soccer players from California
Expatriate footballers in England
Major League Soccer players
USL Championship players
English Football League players
United States men's youth international soccer players
Association football forwards
Homegrown Players (MLS)
American people of Scottish descent